The wrinkle test (attributed as O'Riain's or Leukens' wrinkle test) is a test of peripheral nerve function.  The fingers are placed in warm water for approximately 10 minutes.  If the fingers do not wrinkle, this is a sign of denervation.

See also
Nerve conduction study

References

Neurophysiology
Physical examination